Piacenza is a city and  in the Emilia-Romagna region of northern Italy, and the capital of the eponymous province. As of 2022, Piacenza is the ninth largest city in the region by population, with over 102,000 inhabitants.

Westernmost major city of the region of Emilia-Romagna, it has strong relations with Lombardy, with which it borders, and in particular with Milan. It was once defined by Leonardo da Vinci as "Land of passage", in his Codex Atlanticus, by virtue of its crucial geographical location. Piacenza integrates characteristics of the nearby Ligurian and Piedmontese territories added to a prevalent Lombard influence, favored by communications with the nearby metropolis, which attenuate its Emilian footprint.

Piacenza is located at a major crossroads at the intersection of Route E35/A1 between Bologna and Milan, and Route E70/A21 between Brescia and Turin. Piacenza is also at the confluence of the Trebbia, draining the northern Apennine Mountains, and the Po, draining to the east. Piacenza also hosts two universities, Università Cattolica del Sacro Cuore, Polytechnic University of Milan and University of Parma.

Etymology 
The etymology is long-standing, tracing an origin from the Latin verb , "to please": The name means "pleasant" or (as James Boswell reported some of the etymologists of his time to have translated it) "comely abode", and it was given as a good omen.

History

Ancient history

Pre-Roman era
Before its settlement by the Romans, the area was populated by other peoples; specifically, most recently to the Roman settlement, the region on the right bank of the Po between the Trebbia and the Taro had been occupied by the Ananes or Anamari, a tribe of Cisalpine Gauls. Before then, says Polybius, "These plains were anciently inhabited by Etruscans" before the Gauls took the entire Po Valley from them.

Roman age
Piacenza and Cremona were founded as Roman military colonies in May 218 BC. The Romans had planned to construct them after the successful conclusion of the latest war with the Gauls ending in 219 BC. In the spring of 218 BC, after declaring war on Carthage, the Senate decided to accelerate the foundation and gave the colonists 30 days to appear on the sites to receive their lands. They were each to be settled by 6,000 Roman citizens, but the cities were to receive Latin Rights; that is, they were to have the same legal status as the many colonies that had been co-founded by Rome and towns of Latium.

The reaction of the region's Gauls was swift; they drove the colonists off the lands. Taking refuge in Mutina, the latter sent for military assistance. A small force under Lucius Manlius was prevented from reaching the area. The Senate then sent two legions under Gaius Atelius. Piacenza must have been walled immediately, as the walls were in place when the Battle of the Trebia was fought around the city in December. There is no evidence either textual or archaeological of a prior settlement at that exact location; however, the site would have been obliterated by construction. Piacenza was the 53rd colony to be placed by Rome since its foundation. It was the first among the Gauls of the Po valley.

It had to be supplied by boat after the Battle of Trebbia, when Hannibal controlled the countryside, for which purpose a port (Emporium) was constructed. In 209 BC, Hasdrubal Barca crossed the Alps and laid siege to the city, but he was unable to take it and withdrew. In 200 BC, the Gauls sacked and burned it, selling the population into slavery. Subsequently, the victorious Romans restored the city and managed to recover 2000 citizens. In 198 BC, a combined force of Gauls and Ligurians plundered the whole region. As the people had never recovered from being sold into slavery, in 190 BC they complained to Senate of underpopulation; in response the Senate sent 3000 new settlers. The construction of the Via Aemilia in the 180's made the city easily accessible from the Adriatic ports, which improved trade and the prospects for timely defense.

The Liver of Piacenza, a bronze model of a sheep's liver for the purposes of haruspicy discovered in 1877 at Gossolengo just to the south of Piacenza, bears witness to the survival of the disciplina Etrusca well after the Roman conquest.

Although sacked and devastated several times, the city always recovered and by the 6th century Procopius was calling it "the principal city in the country of Aemilia".

The first Bishop of Piacenza (322–357), San Vittorio, declared Saint Antoninus of Piacenza, a soldier of the Theban Legion (and not to be confused with the sixth-century Antoninus of Piacenza), the patron saint of Piacenza and had the first basilica constructed in his honor in 324. The basilica was restored in 903 and rebuilt in 1101, again in 1562, and is still a church today. The remains of the bishop and the soldier-saint are in urns under the altar. The theme of Antoninus, protector of Piacenza, is well known in art.

Middle Ages

Piacenza was sacked during the course of the Gothic War (535–554). After a short period of being reconquered by the Roman emperor Justinian I, it was conquered by the Lombards, who made it a duchy seat. After its conquest by Francia in the ninth century, the city began to recover, aided by its location along the Via Francigena that later connected the Holy Roman Empire with Rome. Its population and importance grew further after the year 1000. That period marked a gradual transfer of governing powers from the feudal lords to a new enterprising class, as well to the feudal class of the countryside.

In 1095, the city was the site of the Council of Piacenza, in which the First Crusade was proclaimed. From 1126, Piacenza was a free commune and an important member of the Lombard League. In this role, it took part in the war against Frederick I, Holy Roman Emperor, and in the subsequent battle of Legnano (1176). It also successfully fought the neighbouring communes of Cremona, Pavia and Parma, expanding its possessions. Piacenza also captured control of the trading routes with Genoa, where the first Piacentini bankers had already settled, from the Malaspina counts and the bishop of Bobbio.

In the 13th century, despite unsuccessful wars against Frederick I, Piacenza managed to gain strongholds on the Lombardy shore of the Po. The preliminaries of the Peace of Constance were signed in 1183 in the Saint Antoninus church. Agriculture and trade flourished in these centuries, and Piacenza became one of the richest cities in Europe. This is reflected in the construction of many important buildings and in the general revision of the urban plan. Struggles for control were commonplace in the second half of the 13th century, not unlike the large majority of Medieval Italian communes. Scoto's government ended when the Visconti of Milan captured Piacenza, which they would hold until 1447. Duke Gian Galeazzo Visconti rewrote Piacenza's statutes and relocated the University of Pavia to the city. Piacenza then became a possession of the House of Sforza until 1499.

Modern era

A coin from the 16th century features the motto: Placentia floret ("Piacenza flourishes") on one of its sides. The city was progressing economically, chiefly due to the expansion of agriculture in the countryside surrounding the city. Also in the course of that century a new city wall was erected. Piacenza, as part of the Duchy of Milan, was ruled, at alternate times, by the Sforza and by France until 1521, when, under Pope Leo X, it became part of the Papal States. From 1545, following the creation of the Duchy of Parma and Piacenza by Pope Paul III to his son Pier Luigi Farnese, the city was ruled by the House of Farnese.

Piacenza was the capital city of the duchy until Ottavio Farnese, Duke of Parma (1547–1586), moved it to Parma. The city underwent some of its most difficult years during the rule of Odoardo Farnese, Duke of Parma (1622–1646), when between 6000 and 13,000 Piacentini out of a total population of 30,000 died from famine and plague. The city and its countryside were also ravaged by bandits and French soldiers.

Between 1732 and 1859, Parma and Piacenza were ruled by the House of Bourbon. In the 18th century, several edifices which belonged to noble families such as Scotti, Landi and Fogliani were built in Piacenza.

In 1802, Napoleon's army annexed Piacenza to the French Empire. Young Piacentini recruits were sent to fight in Russia, Spain and Germany, while the city was plundered of a great number of artworks which are currently exhibited in many French museums.

The Habsburg government of Marie Louise, Duchess of Parma (1816–1847), is remembered fondly as one of the best in the history of Piacenza; the duchess drained many lands, built several bridges across the Trebbia and the Nure and created educational and artistic activities.

Union with Italy

Austrian troops occupied Piacenza until, in 1860, a plebiscite marked the entrance of the city into the Kingdom of Sardinia. 37,089 voters out of 37,585 voted for the annexation. Piacenza was therefore declared Primogenita dell'Unità di Italia ("First-born of the Unification of Italy") by the monarch. The Piacentini enrolled en masse in Giuseppe Garibaldi's army for the Expedition of the Thousand.

In 1858 the geologist Karl Mayer-Eymar named the Piacenzian Age of the Pliocene Epoch based on deposits close to Piacenza.

In June 1865, the first railway bridge over the Po river in northern Italy was inaugurated (in southern Italy a railroad bridge had already been built in 1839). In 1891, the first Chamber of Workers was created in Piacenza.

World War II
During World War II, the city was heavily bombed by the Allies. The important railway and road bridges across the Trebbia and the Po and the railway yards were destroyed. The historic centre of city itself also suffered collateral damage. In 1944, the bridges over the Po became vital for the supply from Austria of Field Marshal Albert Kesselring's Gothic Line, which protected the withdrawal of Kesselring's troops from Italy. Foremost among these were the railway and road bridges at Piacenza, along with supply depots and railway yards. In Operation Mallory Major, July 12–15, allied medium bombers from Corsica flew 300 sorties a day, knocking out 21 bridges east of Piacenza, and then continued to the west for a total of 90 by July 20. Fighter-bombers prevented reconstruction and cut roads and rail lines. By August 4, all the cities of northern Italy were isolated and had suffered heavy bombing, especially Piacenza. Transport to Genoa to the south or through Turin to the north was impossible; nevertheless, Kesselring continued to supply his men.

On the hills and the Apennine Mountains, partisans were active. On April 25, 1945, a general partisan insurrection by the Italian resistance movement broke out and on 29 April, troops of the Brazilian Expeditionary Force entered the city. In 1996, president Oscar Luigi Scalfaro honoured Piacenza with the gold medal for Valour in Battle.

There was a prisoner of war (POW) camp located here, Veano Camp PG 29, Piacenza.

Geography

Climate 
Climate in this area is humid subtropical with no dry season, constantly moist. Summers are hot and sultry. The Köppen Climate Classification subtype for this climate is "Cfa" (Humid subtropical climate).

Government

Main sights
Piacenza boasts a great number of historical palaces, often characterized by splendid gardens.

Palaces
Palazzo Comunale, also known as il Gotico, was built in 1281 as the town hall. It is a prototypic Broletto of Lombardy. Of the original design, only the northern side was completed, with its typical Ghibelline merlons, the arcaded frame, the central bell tower with two lesser ones at the sides. The façade, with five arcades, is in pink marble in the lower part and in brickwork (decorated with geometrical figures) in the upper part. The main hall has frescoes, and is used for meetings, lectures and conferences.
Palazzo Farnese, begun in 1568 by Ottavio Farnese and his wife, Margaret of Parma. The initial project was devised by Francesco Paciotto, from Urbino, and works were entrusted to Giovanni Bernardo Della Valle, Giovanni Lavezzari and Bernardo Panizzari (Caramosino). The design was modified in 1568 by Giacomo Barozzi da Vignola, better known as "Vignola".
Palazzo Landi, built in the Middle Ages but renovated in the late 15th century.
Palazzo Costa.
Palazzo Somaglia.
Palazzo Baldini, on Via San Siro. 
Palazzo Scotti (also known as Palazzo della Prefettura) housing the Museum of Natural History.
Palazzo dei Mercanti (17th century), the current Town Hall.

Other places of interest
 Piazza Cavalli is the main square of the town. It is named ("Cavalli" means "horses") for the two bronze equestrian monuments of Alexander Farnese, Duke of Parma (r. 1586-), nephew and valiant general of Philip II of Spain) and his son Ranuccio I Farnese, Duke of Parma, who succeeded him. The statues are masterpieces of Francesco Mochi, a Mannerist sculptor.
Piacenza Cathedral: This is the Catholic cathedral of the Roman Catholic Diocese of Piacenza-Bobbio, built from 1122 to 1233 and is a valuable examples of a Northern-Italian Romanesque architecture. The façade, in Veronese pink marble and gilted stone, is horizontally parted by a gallery that dominates the three gates, decorated with capitals and Romanic statues. The interior has a nave and two aisles, divided by 25 large pillars. It has noteworthy frescoes, made in the 14th-16th centuries by Camillo Procaccini and Ludovico Carracci, while those of the dome are by Morazzone and Guercino. The presbytery as a wooden sculpture from 1479, a wooden choir by Giangiacomo da Genova (1471) and statues of Lombard school from the 15th century. The crypt, on the Greek cross plan, has 108 Romanesque small columns and is home to the relics of Saint Justine, to which the first cathedral (crumbled down in the 1117 Verona earthquake) was dedicated.
San Francesco Church: Located centrally in Piazza Cavalli, this 12th-century Romanesque/Gothic edifice assumed the role of civic sanctuary in the Middle Ages. Part of the medieval cloisters remains. The main portal is surmounted by a 15th-century lunette depicting the Ecstasy of St. Francis. The nave and two aisles, are divided by low and sturdy brick pillars that support high gothic arches. The church has a Latin cross layout. The nave, taller than the aisles, has a pentahedric apse in which the aisle apses meet; decorations include 15th-16th centuries frescoes. In 1848, the annexion of Piacenza to the Kingdom of Sardinia was announced from here.
Basilica of Sant'Antonino: This is an example of Romanesque architecture, characterized by a large octagonal tower. It was commissioned by St. Victor, first bishop of the city, in 350 CE, and completed in 375. It contains the relics of the eponymous saint, martyred near Travo, in the Val Trebbia. In 1183 the delegates of Frederick Barbarossa and of the Lombard League met here for the preliminaries of peace of Constance. The church was renovated after damage created by the barbarian invasion, and has a 15th-century cloister. In the interior, the main artworks are the frescoes by Camillo Gervasetti (1622).
Basilica of San Savino: this church was dedicated to St. Victor's successor, was begun in 903 but consecrated only in 1107. The façade and the portico are from the 17th-18th centuries. The presbytery and the crypts contain 12th century polychrome mosaics. The interior is in Lombard-Gothic style, with anthropomorphic capitals of the columns. Over the high altar is a 12th-century wooden crucifix by an unknown artist.
San Giovanni in Canale was founded by the Dominicans in 1220, and enlarged in the mid-16th century.
Santa Maria in Campagna: This Renaissance church, faces Piazzale delle Crociate ("Crusades Square"), so called because Pope Urban II summoned the First Crusade here in 1095. The church was built in 1522–1528 to house a miraculous wooden sculpture of the Madonna. The layout was originally in a central Greek-cross plan, but later altered into a Latin cross type. Il Pordenone frescoed the dome and in two chapels on the left side.
St Sixtus is a Renaissance church with a choir designed by Gio Pietro Pambianco da Colorno and Bartolomeo da Busseto (1512-1514). It was begun in the 15th century over a temple built in 874 by Empress Angilberga. Also by Alessio Tramello is the Church of the Holy Sepulchre. In 1513, the monks of St. Sixtus commissioned Raphael to produce the altarpiece known as the Sistine Madonna. They sold it in 1754 to Augustus III of Poland. It is now on display in Dresden.
 The Piacenza's Archaeological Museum, part of the Civic Museums of Palazzo Farnese, houses the pre-Roman bronze Liver of Piacenza, an Etruscan bronze model of a sheep's liver dating from the end of the 2nd century to the beginning of the 1st century BCE. It was discovered in 1877 in Ciavernasco di Settima, near Gossolengo in the Piacenza hinterland. Containing writing on its surface delineating the various parts of the liver and their significance, it was likely used as an educational tool for students studying haruspicy, or divination.
Palazzo Landi, built in the Middle Ages but rebuilt in the current form in the 15th century by Lombard craftsmen. It has a Renaissance marble portal. It is now seat of the local Tribunal.
 Galleria d'arte moderna Ricci Oddi is an art museum dedicated mainly to modern Italian painters.
 Collegio Alberoni is a Roman Catholic seminary founded by Cardinal Giulio Alberoni in the 18th century. The seminary maintains a gallery which displays Alberoni's personal collection of fine tapestries and Renaissance and Baroque paintings by notable artists such as Luca Giordano, Antonello da Messina, and Guido Reni.

Dialect

Many inhabitants of Piacenza and the surrounding province still use Piacentino, which is a variety of the Emilian dialect the Emilian-Romagnol language. Emilian-Romagnol is a member of a different Romance subfamily (Gallo-Italic) than Standard Italian (which is an Italo-Dalmatian language) and its distinct grammar and phonology make it mutually unintelligible with that language.

Although there have been a number of notable poets and writers using Piacentino, it has experienced a steady decline during the 20th century due to the growing standardization of the Italian language in the national educational system.

Sport
Piacenza Calcio 1919 was the main and most supported football team and played in Serie A for eight seasons. The team ceased to exist in 2012 after its bankruptcy. Currently there are two football teams playing in Serie D: S.S.D. Piacenza Calcio 1919, which acquired Piacenza Football Club coat of arms following the bankruptcy, and Pro Piacenza 1919, which declared bankruptcy in 2019.

Volley Piacenza is the main man volleyball team and currently plays in serie A1; its palmares entails a championship, a national cup, a national supercup and two European cups. River Volley is the main female volleyball team and won the national championship twice.

Rugby is relatively popular compared with Italian standards and Piacenza has a number of rugby teams: Piacenza Rugby Club and Rugby Lyons Piacenza are the most important.

Cuisine

Piacenza and its province are known for the production of seasoned and salted pork products. The main specialities are pancetta (rolled seasoned pork belly, salted and spiced), coppa (seasoned pork neck, containing less fat than pancetta, matured at least for six months) and salame (chopped pork meat flavoured with spices and wine, and made into sausages).

Bortellina (salted pancakes made with flour, salt, and water or milk) and chisulén (torta fritta in Standard Italian; made with flour, milk, and animal fats mixed together and then fried in hot strutto, or clarified pork fat) are the perfect coupling of pancetta, coppa, and salame, but they are also good with cheeses, particularly Gorgonzola and Robiola.

Pisarei e faśö is a mixture of handmade pasta and borlotti beans. This is served with a sauce made of tomato puree, extra virgin olive oil, onion, salt, and pepper. It's preferred to be consumed with grated Parmigiano on top.

Among the culinary specialties of the Piacenza region (although also enjoyed in nearby Cremona) is mostarda di frutta, consisting of preserved fruits in a sugary syrup strongly flavored with mustard. Turtlìt (tortelli dolci in standard Italian), or fruit dumplings, are filled with mostarda di frutta, mashed chestnuts, and other ingredients, and are served at Easter. Turtlìt are also popular in the Ferrara area. Turtéi, a similarly named Piacentine specialty, is a kind of pasta filled with spinaches and ricotta cheese, or filled with calabash. A similar Piacentine dish is the Panzerotti al Forno, which is made with pasta, ricotta cheese and spinach.

Piacentine staple foods include corn (generally cooked as polenta) and rice (usually cooked as risotto), both of which are very common across northern Italy. There are also locally produced cheeses, such as Grana Padano, though nearby Parma is more famous for its dairy products.

The hills surrounding Piacenza are known for their vineyards. The wine produced in this area is qualified with a denominazione di origine controllata called "Colli Piacentini" ("Hills of Piacenza"). The main wines are Gutturnio (red wines, both sparkling and still), Bonarda (a red wine, often sparkling and foamy, made from Croatina grapes), Ortrugo (a dry white wine) and Malvasia (a sweet white wine).

People
 Saint Gerard of Potenza (died 1119), Bishop of Potenza from 1111 until his death.
 Placentinus (died 1192), founder of the Law School of the University of Montpellier.
 Teobaldo Visconti (c. 1210–1276), elected Pope Gregory X.
 Saint Conrad of Piacenza (1290–1351), medieval Franciscan hermit.
 Giovanni Battista Guadagnini (1711–1786), member of the Guadagnini family of luthiers.
 Antonio Cornazzano (c.1432-1484), poet and humanist, courtier at Milan and Ferrara.
 Cardinal Giulio Alberoni (1664-1752), Italian-Spanish statesman who served as Bishop of Malaga and Chief Minister to Philip V of Spain from 1715 to 1719 during the War of the Quadruple Alliance. 
 Melchiorre Gioia (1767–1829), Philosopher and political economist.
 Pietro Giordani (1774–1848), writer and classical literary scholar.
 Amilcare Ponchielli (1834–1886), musician and composer, began his career here in 1861.
 Alfredo Soressi (1897–1982), painter.
 Giacomo Radini-Tedeschi (1857-1914), Bishop of Bergamo and mentor of the future Pope John XXIII
 Giorgio Armani (born 1934), fashion designer.
 Giovanni Paolo Panini (1691–1765), vedute painter and architect
 Luigi Illica (1857–1919), librettist, author and co-author (with Giuseppe Giacosa) of opera librettos for Giacomo Puccini (La bohème, Tosca, Madama Butterfly), Alfredo Catalani (La Wally) and Umberto Giordano (Andrea Chénier). 
 Giuseppe Merosi (1872–1956), automobile engineer.
 Ettore Boiardi (1897–1985), chef, better known as Chef Boyardee.
 Edoardo Amaldi (1908–1989), physicist, professor at Sapienza University of Rome (1938–1979), co-founder of CERN, ESA, and INFN.
Amedeo Guillet (1909–2010), World War II cavalry commander and diplomat, also known as "Comandante Diavolo".
 Cardinal Agostino Casaroli (1914–1998), Catholic priest and diplomat for the Holy See, Cardinal Secretary of State (1979–1990).
 Pino Dordoni (1926–1998), 50 km walk Olympic gold medallist at the 1952 Summer Olympics in Helsinki.
 Tarquinio Provini (1933–2005), twice World Champion Grand Prix motorcycle racer.
 Mario Arcelli (1935–2004), economist and once Minister for Budget of the Italian Government (1996).
 Ettore Gotti Tedeschi (born 1945), economist and banker, former President of the Vatican Bank.
 Gen.  (born 1945), Chief of Staff of the Italian Army (2007-2009).
 Giuseppe Orsi (born 1945), CEO of Finmeccanica (2011-2013). 
 Federico Ghizzoni (born 1955), CEO of Unicredit. 
 Filippo "Pippo" Inzaghi (born 1973), World Cup-winning footballer and football coach.
 Ilaria Ramelli (born 1973), Italian-born historian
 Simone Inzaghi (born 1976), professional footballer.
 Nina Zilli (born 1980), singer and songwriter who represented Italy in the Eurovision Song Contest 2012.
 Giorgia Bronzini (born 1983), cyclist, World Champion of female Cycling in 2010 and 2011.
 Nicolò Fagioli, (born 2001), football player
 Leonardo Fornaroli (born 2004), racing driver

While he himself was born in New York City, highly decorated policeman and US Congressman Mario Biaggi's (1917-2015) parents immigrated there from Piacenza.

International relations

Twin towns — Sister cities

Piacenza is twinned with:
 Plasencia, Spain
 Togliatti, Russia
 Erfurt, Germany
 Placentia, California, United States
 Capilla de Guadalupe, Mexico

See also
Conrad of Piacenza
Piacenza railway station
Roman Catholic Diocese of Piacenza-Bobbio

References

Bibliography

External links

 
 
 Piacenza on The Campanile Project

 
Roman towns and cities in Italy
Roman sites of Emilia-Romagna
Cities and towns in Emilia-Romagna
218 BC
210s BC establishments
Populated places established in the 3rd century BC